The University of Illinois picks a distinguished professor to honor with the Charles E. Merriam Award for Outstanding Public Policy Research.
The award is named after Charles Edward Merriam who was himself a distinguished professor at the University of Chicago.

Winners include

References

Academic awards
Politics awards